And There's More is a British comedy sketch show starring Jimmy Cricket produced by Central Independent Television for ITV from 28 June 1985 to 2 July 1988.

Cast 
Over the four series Jimmy was joined by a number of other people:

Series One
 Rory Bremner 
 Jessica Martin
 Adrian Walsh

Series Two
 Brian Conley
 Hi Ching
 Nicky Croyden
 Fred Evans
 Patti Gold
 Paul Gyngell
 Andrea Levine

Series Three
 Eddie Braben
 Tim Barker 
 Hugh Lloyd
 Granville Saxton
 Joan Sims
 Nicholas Smith

Series Four
 Sherrie Hewson
 Hugh Paddick
 Granville Saxton
 Chris Sullivan

Transmissions
S1: 28 June - 2 August 1985: 6 episodes
S2: 12 July - 16 August 1986: 6 episodes
S3: 3 July - 7 August 1987: 6 episodes 
S4: 28 May - 2 July  1988: 6 episodes

External links

ITV comedy
1985 British television series debuts
1988 British television series endings
1980s British television sketch shows
Television series by ITV Studios
English-language television shows
ITV sketch shows
Television shows produced by Central Independent Television